A One Day International (ODI) is an international cricket match between two teams, each having ODI status, as determined by the International Cricket Council. The women's variant of the game is similar to the men's version, with minor modifications to umpiring and pitch requirements. The first women's ODI was played in 1973, between England and Australia. Japan have played five ODIs, all as part of the 2003 IWCC Trophy, which served as a qualification competition for the 2005 World Cup. They lost all five matches, and did not compete in the subsequent 2008 World Cup Qualifier, but did reappear at the 2011 World Cup Qualifier (where matches did not have ODI status).

Five players have appeared in all of Japan's ODI matches; Kaori Kato, Shizuka Kubota, Ema Kuribayashi, Momoko Saito and Keiko Uchibori. Kubota and Kuribayashi have scored 27 runs each in those games, making them Japan's most prolific batsmen in the format, although Kato's 16 runs were scored at a superior average. Kato, who captained Japan in all of their ODI matches, is also the nation's leading wicket-taker, having taken five wickets. Yuko Sasaki, who only appeared in three of their matches, has the best bowling average, 27.00, and the best bowling performance in an innings, taking two wickets for the concession of only six runs against Scotland.

In the team's five matches, 14 women represented Japan in One Day International cricket. This list includes all players who have played at least one ODI match and is initially arranged in the order of debut appearance. Where more than one player won their first cap in the same match, those players are initially listed alphabetically by last name at the time of debut.

Key

List of players
Statistics are correct as on 26 July 2003, the date of Japan's last women's ODI (Japan Women are not currently active in Women's One Day International cricket). This list includes all players who have played at least one ODI match and is initially arranged in the order of debut appearance. Where more than one player won their first cap in the same match, those players are initially listed alphabetically.

References

Japan
cricketers
Lists of Japanese women